Yann Couvreur is a French pastry chef. He owns several pastry stores in Paris.

Early life and education 

After his third year of middle-school, he decided to take a BEP (Brevet d'Etudes Professionnelles - French professionalizing diploma) in cooking. He then pursued a CAP (Certificat d'Etudes Professionnelles - French professionalizing diploma) to deepen his knowledge in pastry at the Tecomah training center in Jouy-en-Josas. 

Then, he joined the restaurant Le Trianon Palace in Versailles as head chef. He was then hired by Gérard Vié in the double starred establishment Les Trois Marches also in Versailles.

Career as a pastry chef 
In 2008, Yann Couvreur departed for Saint-Barthélemy, and integrated the hotel Eden Rock as a pastry chef. 

After two years, he returned to metropolitan France and took over the to he pastry shop at the hotel Le Burgundy, located not far from the Place de la Madeleine in Paris. 

In 2013, he joined the hotel Le Prince de Galles in the 8th arrondissement of Paris, rue Georges V, as head pastry chef. He accompanied the chef Stéphanie Le Quellec for the reopening of this institution after two years of renovation. 

In 2015, he was approached by M6 (TV channel) to participate in the program Top Chef as a jury during one of the tests. 

His signature dessert is the vanilla mille-feuilles from Madagascar. It received the prize of Dessert of the year by the Lebey guide in 2014.

In 2016, he created the pastries for a meal served on board the Orient Express with his partner, chef Yannick Alléno.

In 2017, he created a 4.5 meter high sculpture in honor of the fox in collaboration with Richard Orlinski at the Salon du Chocolat.

Pastry stores 
Yann Couvreur has several pastry stores in the 11th arrondissement of Paris, in the Marais, in the Galeries Lafayette and at the Gare Montparnasse. He also opened two stores in Dubai.

Books 

 La pâtisserie de Yann Couvreur, 2017
 La pâtisserie de Yann Couvreur pour les enfants, 2020 
 Ephemere - Les desserts a l'assiette, 2019

References

External links 

 Official website: Yann Couvreur Pâtisserie
 Books: La pâtisserie - Yann Couvreur 

French chefs
Pastry chefs
Living people